A virtual workplace is a work environment where employees can perform their duties remotely, using technology such as laptops, smartphones, and video conferencing tools. A virtual workplace is not located in any one physical space. It is usually a network of several workplaces technologically connected (via a private network or the Internet) without regard to geographic boundaries. Employees are thus able to interact in a collaborative working environment regardless of where they are located. A virtual workplace integrates hardware, people, and online processes.

The phenomenon of a virtual workplace has grown in the 2000s as advances in technology have made it easier for employees to work from anywhere with an internet connection. 

The virtual workplace industry includes companies that offer remote work solutions, such as virtual meeting (teleconference) software and project management tools. Consulting firms can also help companies transition to a virtual workplace if needed. The latest technology evolution in the space is virtual office software which allows companies to gather all their team members in one virtual workplace.  Companies in a variety of industries, including technology, finance, and healthcare, are turning to virtual workplaces to increase employee flexibility and productivity, reduce office costs, and attract and retain top talent.

History
As information technology began to play a greater role in the daily operations of organizations, virtual workplaces developed as an augmentation or alternative to traditional work environments of rooms, cubicles and office buildings.

In 2010, the Telework Enhancement Act of 2010 required each Executive agency in the United States to establish a policy allowing remote work to the maximum extent possible, so long as employee performance is not diminished.

During the COVID-19 pandemic, millions of workers began remote work for the first time.

Research from IWG found that 70% of employees globally work remotely at least one day every week, and more than half do so at least half of the week.

Cities in which the population of remote workers increased significantly were referred to as Zoom towns.

Types
Individual virtual workplaces vary in how they apply existing technology to facilitate team cooperation:
Remote work: the availability and use of communications technologies, such as the Internet, to work in an offsite location.
Hot desking: employees do not have individual desks but are rather each day allocated to a desk where they can access technology services including the Internet, email and computer network files. This is similar to "Hoteling": recognizing that employees spend more time at clients' offices than at the employer's office, they are not assigned a permanent desk.
Virtual team: employees collaborate by working closely together and in regular contact, although physically located in different parts of the world.

Drivers

There are several factors that drive the interest in using virtual workplaces.

Office space and its cost 
Office space has become a major expense for many organisations, and virtual meetings can save money by being a direct substitute of meeting face to face. One response has been to reduce the amount of space each employee occupies. Another is to increase the flexibility of the office's layout and design. It is not easy to make the most of these approaches and keep employees happy — unless flexible work practices are also used.

Fuel and energy costs 
The expenses of the energy consumption to physically commute are increasing rapidly. Planners and public policymakers share a strong belief that remote work with a virtual workspace is one of the most sustainable and competitive modes of commuting in terms of travel time and cost, flexibility, and environmental impacts.

Challenges
Some common challenges are:

 Failure to leverage the technology that supports virtual workplaces, resulting in decreased productivity
 Lack of human contact could cause decreased team spirit, trust and productivity (and researchers indicate trust is a vital aspect)
 Increased sensitivity to communication, interpersonal and cultural factors
 Cultural diversity is not yet achieving the expected benefits 
Virtual offices might cause a lack of social interactions and creativity, since the on-site office is often one of the most important source of stress for employees.

Virtual workplace software 
Project management: tracks project progress to ensure complete tasks on time and achieve goals(Project management software).

Productivity management(Performance_management): ensures remote workers are doing their work by using time-tracking tools and productivity reports.

Video conferencing, Web conferencing: allows team access to face-to-face communication through video chat (Comparison of web conferencing software).

Cloud storage: gives every employee a secure, centralized space to store data(:Category:Cloud storage).

Collaborative software(team collaboration): provides a virtual space for hybrid and remote teams to come together (List of collaborative software).

Employee engagement: recognizes and rewards employee efforts to increase team engagement.

Online security(Internet security): for company’s privacy, security, and anonymity when employees are online (Comparison of antivirus software).

Mental wellness: to help remote employees manage anxiety and stress.

See also
 
 Virtual office
 Virtual team

References

 Dempster, Mike Team - Building key for virtual workplace Retrieved on June 26, 2006
 Powell, Anne Virtual Teams - A review of current literature and directions for future research Retrieved on June 26, 2006
 Yager, Susan Everything's coming up virtual Retrieved on June 26, 2006
 Greenlee, Dana Building a community in the virtual workplace Retrieved on June 26, 2006
 Stephen Haag, Maeve Cummings, Donald McCubbrey, Alain Pinsonneault and Richard Donovan Third Canadian Edition Management Information Systems for the Information Age Mcgraw-Hill Ryerson, Canada, 2006

Workplace

Computer-mediated communication
Telecommuting